The Department of Tourism and Recreation was an Australian government department that existed between December 1972 and December 1975.

History
The Department was one of several new Departments established by the Whitlam Government, a wide restructuring that revealed some of the new government's program.

Up until the Department of Tourism and Recreation was established, the prevailing view was that the Commonwealth Government generally had no role to play in relation to sport and recreation, which were instead matters for state and local governments.

Shortly after the Fraser Government took office in November 1975, following the 1975 Australian constitutional crisis, the Department was abolished, with its functions taken up by other departments.

Scope
Information about the department's functions and/or government funding allocation could be found in the Administrative Arrangements Orders, the annual Portfolio Budget Statements and in the Department's annual reports.

At its creation, the Department dealt with:
Promotion of tourism in Australia and between other countries and Australia
Regulation of the tourist industry
Recreation, sport and physical culture

Structure
The Department was an Australian Public Service department, staffed by officials who were responsible to the Minister for Tourism and Recreation.

Notes

References

Tourism and Recreation
Australia, Tourism and Recreation